James Houra (27 March 1952 – 27 January 2020) was an Ivorian painter.

Biography
He served as director of the École des beaux arts d'Abidjan and was known for his checkerboard paintings. One of his paintings, Offrande, is on display at the Presidential Palace in Abidjan. Another one of his paintings was offered to French Minister of the Interior, Claude Guéant, by President Ouattara, and is a source of controversy due to the fact that the painting was not returned at the end of the former's term of office.

Houra's works have been valued between 2000 and 25,000 euros.

James Houra died on 27 January 2020 at the age of 67.

References

1952 births
2020 deaths
Ivorian painters